Acestridium martini is a species of armored catfish in the genus Acestridium. It is native to the upper Orinoco and Negro river basins in South America.

References
Retzer, Michael E., Leo G. Nico and Francisco Provenzano R.: Two new species of Acestridium (Siluriformes: Loricariidae) from southern Venezuela, with observations on camouflage and color change. Ichthyological Exploration of Freshwaters, Volume 10(4)(1999)(p. 313)

External link
  Global Biodiversity Information Facility
  Aquatic Republic
  Planet Catfish

Fish of South America
Hypoptopomatini
Taxa named by Michael Eugene Retzer
Fish described in 1999